Thracian may refer to:

In history
Thracians, an ancient Indo-European people
List of Thracian tribes
Thraco-Cimmerian
Thraco-Illyrian
Thraco-Roman
Thracian language, an extinct language spoken by the Thracians
Thracian mythology, the mythology of the Thracians
Thracian horseman, an ancient cult
Thraex/Thracian, a type of Roman gladiator

People
Maximinus the Thracian, a Roman emperor
Dionysius the Thracian, an Ancient Greek grammarian

In geography
Thracian Sea, a sea part of the Aegean Sea
Thracian Chersonese, the ancient name of the Gallipoli peninsula 
Thracian Basin, a basin in Turkey
Thracian Plain, a plain in Bulgaria

In arts
The Thracian Wonder, a play
Thracian Tomb of Sveshtari, an ancient tomb
Thracian Tomb of Kazanlak, an ancient tomb

Other uses
Thracian Bulgarians, the ethnic Bulgarian people from Northern Thrace
Thracian Greeks, the ethnic Greek people from Western Thrace or the whole region of Thrace
Turks of Western Thrace, the ethnic Turkish people from Western Thrace

See also
Thrace (disambiguation)
Thracology

Language and nationality disambiguation pages